Shelley Duvall's Bedtime Stories (also known as Bedtime Stories) is a 1992 American live-action/animated anthology television series that originally aired on Showtime. The series, hosted by Duvall, was a showcase of short animated adaptations of children's books with narration provided by celebrity guests.  The VHSs are released by Universal Studios Home Video but are close captioned by the National Captioning Institute instead of Captions, Inc.

Format
Shelley Duvall hosts a showcase of animated adaptations of children's books from her pop-up book bedroom. The first season's hosting segments are limited to Duvall herself, but in the second season a lamp named Clicker and a Clock named Ticker were added to the segments. Each episode would typically contain two segments where Duvall would introduce the book which would then transition to an animated segment read by a celebrity guest narrator. Guests who appeared on the show included: Ringo Starr, Bette Midler, Dudley Moore, John Candy, Rick Moranis, Bonnie Raitt, Sissy Spacek, Michael J. Fox, Martin Short and James Earl Jones

Cast
Shelley Duvall as herself/host
B.J. Ward as Clicker the Lamp
Jeff Bennett Ticker the Clock

Episodes

Season one

Season two

Accolades
Shelley Duvall's Bedtime Stories was nominated for Primetime Emmy Award for Outstanding Animated Program in the 44th Primetime Emmy Awards in 1992 but lost to A Claymation Easter on CBS.

References

External links
 

1990s American animated television series
1990s American anthology television series
1990s American children's television series
1992 American television series debuts
American children's animated anthology television series
American television series with live action and animation
American television shows featuring puppetry
English-language television shows
Television series by Universal Animation Studios
Showtime (TV network) original programming